Michael J. Lambert (born July 17, 1944) is an American psychologist, professor, researcher, and author whose work in psychotherapy led to the development of Routine Outcome Monitoring, which involves regularly measuring and monitoring client progress with standardized self-report scales throughout the course of treatment. Lambert and colleague Gary Burlingame are recognized as experts in psychotherapy outcome measurement research.

See also 
 OQ Measures

References

External links 
 BYU - College of Family, Home, and Social Sciences
 OQ Measures
 OQ 45.2
 Amazon listing of books by Lambert
Lambert's Vita
 Short bio of Lambert

21st-century American psychologists
American psychotherapists
1944 births
University of Utah alumni
Brigham Young University faculty
Living people
20th-century American psychologists